υ Gruis, Latinised as Upsilon Gruis, is a double star in the southern constellation of Grus. The apparent magnitude is 5.61, which is bright enough to be viewed with the naked eye. Located around  distant, the white-hued primary is an A-type main-sequence star of spectral type A1V, a star that is currently fusing its core hydrogen. it is spinning rapidly with a projected rotational velocity of 320 km/s. The companion is a magnitude 8.24 star at an angular separation of 0.90″ from the primary along a position angle of 205°, as of 2009.

References

Grus (constellation)
Gruis, Upsilon
A-type main-sequence stars
114132
CD-39 14936
218242
8790